Statistics of Swedish football Division 3 for the 1956–57 season.

League standings

Norra Norrland 1956–57

Mellersta Norrland 1956–57

Södra Norrland 1956–57

Norra Svealand 1956–57

Östra Svealand 1956–57

Västra Svealand 1956–57

Nordöstra Götaland 1956–57

Nordvästra Götaland 1956–57

Mellersta Götaland 1956–57

Sydöstra Götaland 1956–57

Sydvästra Götaland 1956–57

Södra Götaland 1956–57

Footnotes

References 

Swedish Football Division 3 seasons
3
Swed